HMY Osborne was a paddle steamer Royal Yacht of the Royal Navy of the United Kingdom. Designed by Edward James Reed, she was launched on 19 December 1870 at Pembroke Royal Dockyard and replaced the yacht of the same name formerly known as HMY Victoria and Albert.

She measured 1,850 tons, and was used for cruises to foreign countries and later on the short run to Osborne House on the Isle of Wight.

Commander Charles Eustace Anson was appointed in command on 28 December 1899, and was in command during the funeral arrangements for Queen Victoria the following month.

External links
 National Maritime Museum
 search results for 'HMY Osborne

Footnotes

External links
 

Royal Yachts of the United Kingdom
1870 ships
Steam yachts
Individual yachts